Peadar Lamb (1930 – 1 September 2017) was an Irish actor. He was known for his roles in numerous Irish-language stage productions, including playing King Fin Varra in the television series Mystic Knights of Tir Na Nog, and lending his voice to Old Piggley Winks on the children's television series Jakers! The Adventures of Piggley Winks.

Early life
Lamb grew up in An Cheathrú Rua, Carraroe. His father, Charles Lamb, was a well-known painter. Peadar Lamb trained at the Abbey Theatre and first appeared on stage in 1954.

Career

Theatre
Lamb had a theatrical career lasting over 60 years. Over the course of this time, he played diverse characters and appeared in a number of plays by famous playwrights including Brendan Behan, Dion Boucicault and Seán O'Casey:
Estragon in Samuel Beckett's Waiting for Godot
Dunlavin and Warder Regan in The Quare Fellow (Behan's first play)
Monsewer in The Hostage and An Giall
Police informer Harvey Duff in The Shaughraun
Myles na Coppaleen in The Colleen Bawn
Brennan o' the Moor in Red Roses For Me
Mr. Gallogher in The Shadow of a Gunman

Other stage performances include a role as Curly in John Murphy's The Country Boy and as the blind man in W. B. Yeats' On Baile's Strand. Lamb toured America and Canada in 1990 with John Millington Synge's The Playboy of the Western World. In June 2002, Peadar Lamb and his wife Geraldine Plunkett played leading roles in a production of Tony Guerin's play Hummin', performed by the Waterford-based Red Kettle Company.

Television
Lamb appeared on many series broadcasts on RTÉ One, including television soap operas Fair City and Ros na Rún. He appeared in a 1998 episode of the sitcom Father Ted and played Mr. Hasson in the British drama film The Railway Station Man, opposite Donald Sutherland and Julie Christie. He also played fairy King Fin Varra in the television series Mystic Knights of Tir Na Nog, loosely based on Irish mythology and voiced Old Piggley Winks on the children's television series Jakers! The Adventures of Piggley Winks.

Teaching
Lamb qualified as a primary school teacher before becoming an actor full time and later taught young actors at his alma mater, Abbey School of Acting.

Personal life
Lamb was married to actress Geraldine Plunkett from 1965. They had seven children.

Lamb died in his sleep at his home in Glenageary, Ireland, on 1 September 2017 at the age of 87.

Filmography

References

External links
 

1930 births
2017 deaths
Actors from County Galway
Irish male actors
Irish male voice actors
Irish male television actors
Irish male stage actors
20th-century Irish male actors
21st-century Irish male actors